Subhash Thakur is an Indian member of the legislative assembly (MLA) from Bilaspur, Himachal Pradesh. He defeated Bumber Thakur of Indian National Congress (INC) by 6862 votes.

References

Year of birth missing (living people)
Living people
Himachal Pradesh MLAs 2017–2022
Bharatiya Janata Party politicians from Himachal Pradesh